Eileen Magrath was a British actress.

Selected filmography
 The Children of Gibeon (1920)
 The Town of Crooked Ways (1920)
 By Berwin Banks (1920)
 His Other Wife (1921)
 The Lonely Lady of Grosvenor Square (1922)
 Finished (1923)

References

External links
 

Year of birth missing
Year of death missing
British film actresses
British silent film actresses